SC Steinfort was a football club from Luxembourg is a football club, based in Steinfort, in western Luxembourg.

New-Original Club 2019 FC Stengefort (Since 1923)

History
SC Steinfort was only founded in 2007, a result of the merger of Sporting Steinfort and Sporting Club Lissabon Luxemburg. They immediately won promotion to the Luxembourg National Division after claiming 3rd spot in the Second Division at the end of the 2007/2008 season. They then beat FC Wiltz 71 2–0 in a promotion/relegation play-off match. In 2008/09 the club finished in 13th place and were relegated to the Luxembourg Division of Honour.

Staff

References

External links
 SC Steinfort official website

Steinfort
2007 establishments in Luxembourg